Events from the year 1769 in Denmark.

Incumbents
 Monarch – Christian VII
 Prime minister –  Count Johann Hartwig Ernst von Bernstorff

Events
 29 January  The Royal Danish Agricultural Society is founded.
 15 August – The first census in Denmark-Norway to attempt completely covering all citizens (including women and children who had previously been listed only as numbers) takes place. At that point, Norway included, there 797,584 citizens in Denmark.
 14 September – The outbreak of the  Danish-Algerian War.
 18  The island of Møn is divided into estates and sold at public auction in Stege.
 Estate No. 1 (Nygård, later Marienborg) is sold to quartermaster Esaias Fleischer for r 40,550 rigsdaler.
 Estate No. 2 (Fanegjord) is sold to the local farmers for   42,750 rigsdaler.
 Estate No. 3 (Sønderskov) is sold to the local farmers for 30,450 rigsdaler.
 Rstate No. 4 (Nordfeld) is sold tp local farmers  for 41,650 rigssdaler.
 Estate No. 5 (Klintholm) is sold  to Hans Tersling for 50,000 rigsdaler.
 Ålebækgård is sold to Ålebækgårdskoven,
Sømarke and the northern part of Klinteskoven (now Liselund) were sold to Mathias Schmidt.

Undated
 – Thomas Potter, a Scottish emigrant, establishes the first iron foundry in Denmark at Applebys Plads in Christianshavn, Copenhagen.

Culture

Art
 Ulrich Ferdinandt Beenfeldt cmpletes the Fenger family portrait.

Births
 22 February – Hans Hansen, portrait painter (died 1828)
 28 March  Schack von Staffeldt, author (died 1826)
 24 July – Peter Johansen Neergaard, landowner (died 1835)

Deaths
 Birgitte Sofie Gabel, noble and courtier (died 1746)

References

 
1760s in Denmark
Denmark
Years of the 18th century in Denmark